"Monte Castelo" is a song by Brazilian rock band Legião Urbana, released on As Quatro Estações album. Written by vocalist and acoustic guitarist Renato Russo, the song brings verses by Portuguese poet Luís de Camões and sections of the Bible.

Writing 
The first versions of the song was based on the acoustic guitar and a keyboard synthesizing an accordion, over which Russo tried to sing. He struggled to find a melody line and ended up recording many channels with his voice, making the music base and the lyrics so chaotic. The text became so scary that made guitarist Dado Villa-Lobos and his wife Fernanda fled from the studio after they read the written words.

The mixing was also hard, since Russo would never be satisfied with producer Mayrton Bahia's work. The situation reached a point to Russo turned off the sound and Bahia threatened to finish the album without him. Russo didn't say a word and then he said he liked the final result. Villa-Lobos, on the other turn, cried when he listened to the song's final version.

Noteworthy covers 

 1999 - Singer Jerry Adriani recorded an Italian version of the song on the album Forza Sempre, featuring only Legião Urbana's songs in Italian.
 2009 - Jay Vaquer took part in the TV special "Som Brasil", a program by Rede Globo de Televisão which paid tribue to Russo and in which he covered "Pais e Filhos", "Monte Castelo" and "Será".
 2012 - Priest Reginaldo Manzotti covered the song for his DVD Paz e Luz, which was filmed at Igreja da Candelária in Rio de Janeiro.

References 

 

Legião Urbana songs
1989 songs
Songs written by Renato Russo